The Kastraki Dam is an earth-fill embankment dam on the Achelous River near the village of Kastraki in Aitoloakarnania, Greece. It was completed in 1969 for the purposes of hydroelectric power generator, flood control and irrigation. The dam's power station houses four 80 MW Francis turbine-generators for an installed capacity of 320 MW.

Terna plans the 680 MW / 5,872 MWh Amphilochia pumped-storage hydroelectricity facility, using Kastraki as the lower reservoir, and a 5 million cubic metre and a 2 million cubic metre as upper reservoirs.

See also

 Energy in Greece
 Renewable energy in Greece

References

Dams in Greece
Hydroelectric power stations in Greece
Earth-filled dams
Dams completed in 1969
Dams on the Achelous River
Buildings and structures in Aetolia-Acarnania
1969 establishments in Greece
Energy infrastructure completed in 1969

de:Kastraki-Stausee
no:Kastraki-demningen